Quick '20 (short for Katholieke Voetbal Vereniging Quick 1920 , Eng.: Catholic Football Club Quick 1920) is a football club from Oldenzaal, Netherlands. The club was founded in 1920 and is currently playing in the Derde Divisie, which is the second highest tier of amateur football in the Netherlands and the fourth tier in general.

In the 2019 Club Friendlies, Quick lost 11–2 to Ajax.

References

External links
 Official site

Football clubs in the Netherlands
Association football clubs established in 1920
1920 establishments in the Netherlands
Football clubs in Overijssel
Oldenzaal